Irving Allen (born Irving Applebaum, November 24, 1905 – December 17, 1987) was a theatrical and cinematic producer and director.

He received an Academy Award in 1948 for producing the short movie Climbing the Matterhorn. In the early 1950s, he formed Warwick Films with partner Albert "Cubby" Broccoli and relocated to England to leverage film making against a subsidy offered by the British government. Through the 1950s, they each became known as one of the best independent film producers of the day, as the two men would sometimes work in tandem, but more often than not on independent projects for their joint enterprise producing multiple projects in a given year.

Biography
Born in Lemberg (Austro-Hungary), Allen entered the film industry as an editor at Universal, Paramount and Republic in 1929. During the 1940s, he made a sequence of shorts, including the Academy Award-nominated Forty Boys and a Song (1941), which he directed. His short films often won more acclaim than his low-budget features. In the late 1940s, Allen started concentrating more fully on being a producer.

Warwick Films
In the early 1950s, he led Warwick Films as the 'name producer', making films in both the US and England, with Albert R. Broccoli something of a junior partner. In 1957–1958, his partnership with Broccoli was strained both by Broccoli's family health crises (his second wife became terminally ill, soon after adopting one child and with a newborn) and to a lesser extent their disagreement over the film potential of the James Bond novel series. Broccoli was very interested, believing the novels could lead to a high quality series of films, and Allen was not, eschewing the potential of Broccoli's vision of Bond in favor of older established forms. The partners met with Bond author Ian Fleming separately in 1957, Cubby from New York where he'd retreated to care for his wife, but in the London meeting with Fleming arranged by Broccoli, Allen all but insulted Fleming, declaring that Fleming's novels weren't even "good enough for television". Broccoli mired in his troubles in New York, only knew that no deal had occurred until pre-production meetings with Fleming which resulted in the decision to make the Dr. No, as the first film project by Eon Productions.

In 1959, captivated by the historical importance and a good script Warwick undertook the risky project of producing, funding, and distributing The Trials of Oscar Wilde, which was released in 1960. Ahead of the times, its frank unprejudiced depiction of homosexual issues ran into a ratings stone wall in the United States all but preventing any sort of advertising, and the company lost its large investment, Broccoli and Allen fell out, and the partnership became moribund, being dissolved officially in a 1961 bankruptcy liquidation.

Thus the two partners each turned into solo producers in late 1960. Broccoli went on to found Danjaq, S.A. and Eon Productions with Harry Saltzman beginning the Bond films on a shoestring budget, and Allen occupied himself with other projects.

Matt Helm
Some years later, Allen cast about for his own spy series. He acquired the rights to Donald Hamilton's Matt Helm series. Allen was responsible for the Matt Helm series, The Silencers (1966), Murderers' Row (1966), The Ambushers (1967), and The Wrecking Crew (1969).

In July 1967, Allen said "At this stage I"m only interested in making money. I'm not interested in kudos or getting good reviews - I've had all that. I'm just concerned with getting the greatest number of people into theatres." "I've done practically everything," he said. "There's no place I haven't been in the business. The only thing I can't do is write."

Allen's Helm series had one major effect on Broccoli's Bond movies (produced at the time in partnership with Harry Saltzman). To get Dean Martin on board as Matt Helm, Allen had to make the actor a partner in the enterprise. Dean Martin ended up making more money on The Silencers (1966) than Sean Connery made on Thunderball (1965). This did not go unnoticed by Connery.

Allen was buried at the Forest Lawn Memorial Park in Hollywood, California.

Filmography
Forty Boys and a Song (documentary, 1941) - director
Avalanche (1946) - director
Strange Voyage (1946) - director
Climbing the Matterhorn (documentary, 1947) - director, producer
High Conquest (1947) - director, producer
16 Fathoms Deep (1948) - director, producer
Chase of Death (short, 1949) - director, producer
The Man on the Eiffel Tower (1950) - uncredited director, producer
Slaughter Trail (1951) - director, producer
New Mexico (1951) - producer
The Return of Gilbert& Sullivan (short, 1951) - director, producer
 The Red Beret (1953) - producer
 Hell Below Zero (1954) - producer
 The Black Knight (1954) - producer
 A Prize of Gold (1955) - executive producer
 The Cockleshell Heroes (1955)
 Safari (1956) - producer
April in Portugal (1956) (short) - producer
 Odongo (1956) - executive producer
 Zarak (1956) - executive producer
 The Gamma People (1956) - executive producer
 Interpol/Pickup Alley (1957) - producer
 Fire Down Below (1957) - producer
 How to Murder a Rich Uncle (1957)
 The Long Haul (1957)
 High Flight (1957)
A Day in Trinidad (short, 1957) - executive producer
 No Time to Die /Tank Force (1958) - producer
 The Man Inside (1958) - producer
 Idol on Parade (1959) - producer
 The Bandit of Zhobe (1959) - producer
 Killers of Kilimanjaro (1959) - producer
 Jazz Boat (1960) - executive producer
 The Trials of Oscar Wilde (1960) - executive producer
 In the Nick (1960) - executive producer
 Johnny Nobody (1961) - executive producer
The Heillions (1961) - executive producer
The Long Ships (1964) - producer
Genghis Khan (1965) - producer
The Silencers (1966) - producer
Murderers' Row (1966) - producer
The Ambushers (1967) - producer
Hammerhead (1968) - producer
The Wrecking Crew (1968) - producer
The Desperados (1969) - producer
Cromwell (1970) - producer
Eyewitness (1970) - executive producer
Matt Helm (TV series, 1975) - executive producer

References

External links
 
 

1905 births
1987 deaths
American film producers
Burials at Forest Lawn Memorial Park (Hollywood Hills)
Austro-Hungarian emigrants to the United States
People from the Kingdom of Galicia and Lodomeria
Film people from Lviv
20th-century American businesspeople